Jeffery Daniel Mercer (born July 25, 1985) is an American college baseball coach and former first baseman. He is head baseball coach at the Indiana University. He played college baseball at the University of Dayton from 2005 to 2007 before transferring to Wright State University to play in 2008 and 2009. In 2009, he was named the Horizon League Player of the Year. He was the head baseball coach at Wright State University from 2017 to 2018.

Coaching career
On July 16, 2016, Mercer was named the head coach for the Wright State Raiders baseball team.

On July 2, 2018, Indiana University Athletics announced the hiring of Mercer, to the head coaching position for the Hoosiers.

On May 21, 2019, Mercer was named Big Ten Coach of the Year, following his first year as coach of the Indiana Hoosiers.

Head coaching record

See also
 List of current NCAA Division I baseball coaches

References

1985 births
Living people
Baseball pitchers
Baseball first basemen
Wright State Raiders baseball coaches
Wright State Raiders baseball players
Michigan Wolverines baseball coaches
Western Kentucky Hilltoppers baseball coaches
Dayton Flyers baseball players
Indiana Hoosiers baseball coaches